This is a list of songs about County Wicklow, Ireland. 

 "In Wicklow (The Mountains are Higher than Rain)" - by Thomas Creen and Teresa McGettigan
 "Sunrise on the Wicklow Hills" - E. McNulty (words) and T. Madden (music) from a musical called The King of Dublin
 "The Wicklow Rover" - written by Pat Molloy from Roundwood
 "The Vales around Cloughlea" -  by local songwriter Frank Farrelly
 "Derrybawn"  
 "The Blackbird of Sweet Avondale" - about Charles Stewart Parnell, recorded by the Wolfe Tones
 "Avondale" - about Charles Stewart Parnell, written by Dominic Behan
 "My Wicklow Hills so Gay" - by a songwriter from Ballyknockan
 "Down by the Tanyard Side"
 "The Banks of Avonmore" - written by Peter Cunningham-Grattan (died 1956)
 "The Wicklow Mountains High"
 "The Wicklow Vales for Me" - by Father Butler.
 "Among the Wicklow Hills" - two songs with this name; one written by Johnny McCauley and recorded by Foster and Allen, Larry Cunningham, etc., the other written by Pierce Turner as "Wicklow Hills" and retitled and performed by Christy Moore as "Among the Wicklow Hills".
 "Billy Byrne from Ballymanus" - about one of the leaders of the 1798 rebellion
 "The Cow ate the piper"
 "Dunlavin Green" - a local ballad written in response to the Massacre of Dunlavin Green which occurred on May 24, 1798
 "The Glendalough Saint"
 "The Hill of Clonroe"
 "The Meeting of the Waters" - written by Thomas Moore, recorded by Paddy Reilly

See also
 Music of Ireland

References

Wicklow
 
Irish styles of music
Wicklow
Wicklow